Feng Zhe (born November 19, 1987 in Sichuan) is a male Chinese gymnast. He is the 2010 World Champion and the 2012 Olympic Champion on the parallel bars.  He was also part of the Chinese team that won the team gold at the 2012 Summer Olympics.

See also

 China at the 2012 Summer Olympics

References

External links
 

1987 births
Living people
Chinese male artistic gymnasts
Medalists at the World Artistic Gymnastics Championships
Sportspeople from Sichuan
World champion gymnasts
Gymnasts at the 2012 Summer Olympics
Olympic gymnasts of China
Olympic gold medalists for China
Olympic medalists in gymnastics
Sportspeople from Chengdu
Medalists at the 2012 Summer Olympics
Asian Games medalists in gymnastics
Gymnasts at the 2010 Asian Games
Asian Games gold medalists for China
Asian Games silver medalists for China
Medalists at the 2010 Asian Games
Gymnasts from Sichuan
The Amazing Race contestants
21st-century Chinese people